Kuwait Squash Federation is the National Organisation for Squash in Kuwait.

See also
 Kuwait men's national squash team

External links
Official site

Squash in Kuwait
National members of the World Squash Federation